Pseudospectral optimal control is a joint theoretical-computational method for solving optimal control problems. It combines pseudospectral (PS) theory with optimal control theory to produce PS optimal control theory. PS optimal control theory has been used in ground and flight systems in military and industrial applications. The techniques have been extensively used to solve a wide range of problems such as those arising in UAV trajectory generation, missile guidance, control of robotic arms, vibration damping, lunar guidance, magnetic control, swing-up and stabilization of an inverted pendulum, orbit transfers, tether libration control, ascent guidance and quantum control.

Overview
There are a very large number of ideas that fall under the general banner of pseudospectral optimal control.  Examples of these are the Legendre pseudospectral method, the Chebyshev pseudospectral method, the Gauss pseudospectral method, the Ross-Fahroo pseudospectral method, the Bellman pseudospectral method, the flat pseudospectral method and many others. Solving an optimal control problem requires the approximation of three types of mathematical objects: the integration in the cost function, the differential equation of the control system, and the state-control constraints. An ideal approximation method should be efficient for all three approximation tasks. A method that is efficient for one of them, for instance an efficient ODE solver, may not be an efficient method for the other two objects. These requirements make PS methods ideal because they are efficient for the approximation of all three mathematical objects. In a pseudospectral method, the continuous functions are approximated at a set of carefully selected quadrature nodes. The quadrature nodes are determined by the corresponding orthogonal polynomial basis used for the approximation. In PS optimal control, Legendre and Chebyshev polynomials are commonly used. Mathematically, quadrature nodes are able to achieve high accuracy with a small number of points. For instance, the interpolating polynomial of any smooth function (C) at Legendre–Gauss–Lobatto nodes converges in L2 sense at the so-called spectral rate, faster than any polynomial rate.

Details
A basic pseudospectral method for optimal control is based on the covector mapping principle. Other pseudospectral optimal control techniques, such as the Bellman pseudospectral method, rely on node-clustering at the initial time to produce optimal controls.  The node clusterings occur at all Gaussian points.

Moreover, their structure can be highly exploited to make them more computationally efficient, as ad-hoc scaling and Jacobian computation methods, involving dual number theory have been developed.

In pseudospectral methods, integration is approximated by quadrature rules, which provide the best numerical integration result. In the PS discretization of the ODE involved in optimal control problems, a simple but highly accurate differentiation matrix is used for the derivatives. Because a PS method enforces the system at the selected nodes, the state-control constraints can be discretized straightforwardly. All these mathematical advantages make pseudospectral methods a straightforward discretization tool for continuous optimal control problems.

See also
Bellman pseudospectral method
Chebyshev pseudospectral method
Covector mapping principle
Flat pseudospectral methods
Gauss pseudospectral method
Legendre pseudospectral method
Pseudospectral knotting method
Ross–Fahroo lemma
Ross–Fahroo pseudospectral methods
Ross' π lemma

References

External links
 How Stuff Works
 Pseudospectral optimal control: Part 1
 Pseudospectral optimal control: Part 2

Software
 DIDO – MATLAB tool for optimal control named after Dido, the first queen of Carthage. 
 GPOPS-II: General Purpose Optimal Control Software
 GESOP – Graphical Environment for Simulation and OPtimization
 OpenOCL – Open Optimal Control Library
 PROPT – MATLAB Optimal Control Software
 PSOPT – Open Source Pseudospectral Optimal Control Solver in C++
 SPARTAN: Simple Pseudospectral Algorithm for Rapid Trajectory ANalysis 
 OpenGoddard – Python Open Source Pseudospectral Optimal Control Software

Optimal control